Klisura, a South Slavic word of Greek origin (kleisoúra), for "pass", "gorge" or "canyon", may refer to:

Albania
Këlcyrë, a Byzantine town, now in Albania

Bosnia and Herzegovina
Klisura (Višegrad), a village in the municipality of Višegrad
Klisura, Fojnica, a village in the municipality of Fojnica

Bulgaria
Klisura, Blagoevgrad Province, a village
Klisura, Plovdiv Province, a town
, a village in Bankya District, Sofia City Province
, a village in Samokov Municipality, Sofia Province

North Macedonia
Klisura, North Macedonia, a village in Demir Kapija Municipality

Serbia

Inhabited places
Klisura (Doljevac), Nišava
Klisura (Bela Palanka), Pirot
Klisura (Surdulica), Pčinja District
Klisurski Monastery, a Serbian Orthodox monastery

Gorges and canyons
Kaçanik Gorge, on the Lepenac river
Ovčar-Kablar Gorge, on the West Morava river
Sićevo Gorge, on the Nišava River
Iron Gates, on the river Danube

People
 Sara Klisura (born 1992), Serbian professional volleyball player

See also
 
 Clisura Dunării, Romania
 Kleisoura (disambiguation)